ETNZ may refer to:

 Emirates Team New Zealand
 Entertainment Technology New Zealand